Daniel Warner may refer to:

 Daniel Warner (artist) (born 1974), artist and graphic designer
 Daniel Webster Warner (1857–1933), farmer, rancher and Canadian federal politician
 Daniel Bashiel Warner (1815–1880), President of Liberia, 1864–1868
 Daniel Sidney Warner (1842–1895), church reformer and a founder of the Church of God (Anderson)